Koen Bucker (born 18 June 1996) is a Dutch professional footballer who plays as a goalkeeper for Dutch club Heracles Almelo.

Club career
A youth product of AZ, Bucker made his professional debut with Jong AZ in a 1–0 loss to RKC Waalwijk on 12 January 2018. He transferred to Heracles Almelo on 31 February 2018.

References

External links
 
 DFB Profile

1996 births
Living people
People from Zaanstad
Dutch footballers
Association football goalkeepers
Heracles Almelo players
Jong AZ players
Eredivisie players
Eerste Divisie players